Ella Smith may refer to:

Ella Gaunt Smith (1868–1932), American doll manufacturer
Ella Smith (actress) (born 1983), Welsh actress